Johan Georg "Jan" Nagel (born 20 June 1939) is a Dutch politician who was a member of the Labour Party, and later formed his own parties. He is currently in the Pensioners' Party 50PLUS.

Nagel started his career in his twenties on VARA-Radio where he worked as a producer. At the same time he served as a member of the executive committee of the Dutch Labour Party. Nagel was one of the creators of the radio-program called In de Rooie Haan. He also wrote his Tien over Rood which served as a political manifesto of the Nieuw Links within the Dutch Labour Party. From 1977 to 1983 Nagel was a PvdA deputy in the Dutch House of Representatives. At VARA-Radio he eventually became the editor-in-chief of the Achter het Nieuws.

Preoccupied with the problem of the widening gap between politics and people, he founded in 1993 a local party called Leefbaar Hilversum. In 2001 he established Leefbaar Nederland where he worked with Henk Westbroek, Willem van Kooten, Ton Luiting, Broos Schnetz and Pim Fortuyn. He has also been the party chairman of Leefbaar Nederland. In 2005 there followed the Party for Justice, Action and Progress (in Dutch: Partij voor Rechtvaardigheid, Daadkracht en Vooruitgang (PRDV)) which he founded together with the former police spokesman Klaas Wilting, entrepreneur Peter Schouten and the party's first lijsttrekker reporter Peter R. de Vries. His autobiography Boven het maaiveld was published in 2001. Nagel participated in the Provincial States elections of 2 March 2011 as a founding member of 50PLUS. His son in law is chess grandmaster Yasser Seirawan.

References

External links
Official

  J.G. (Jan) Nagel Parlement & Politiek
  J.G. Nagel (50PLUS) Eerste Kamer der Staten-Generaal

 

 

 

 
 

 
 

 
 

1939 births
Living people
20th-century Dutch journalists
20th-century Dutch male writers
20th-century Dutch politicians
21st-century Dutch journalists
21st-century Dutch male writers
21st-century Dutch politicians
50PLUS politicians
Aldermen in North Holland
Chairmen of 50PLUS
Dutch magazine editors
Dutch political commentators
Dutch political party founders
Dutch political writers
Dutch radio producers
Dutch republicans
Dutch television editors
Dutch television producers
Labour Party (Netherlands) politicians
Leaders of 50PLUS
Livable Netherlands politicians
Members of the Senate (Netherlands)
Municipal councillors of Hilversum
Politicians from Amsterdam
Mass media people from Amsterdam